Clausotrypa is an extinct genus of prehistoric bryozoans in the family Nikiforovellidae. The species C. elegans is from a Wordian (Permian) marine horizon in the Sijiashan Formation of Northeast China.

See also 
 List of prehistoric bryozoan genera

References

External links 

 
 
 Clausotrypa at bryozoa.net

Stenolaemata genera
Prehistoric bryozoan genera
Rhabdomesida
Fossil taxa described in 1929
Paleozoic life of British Columbia
Paleozoic life of Nunavut
Extinct bryozoans